The Milwaukee Country Club is a golf club located in River Hills, Wisconsin. It is the home club of the late renowned teaching pro Manuel de la Torre

The golf course features a 6,875 yards of golf from the longest tees for a par of 72. The course rating is 73.8 while the slope rating is 135 on Bent grass. Colt, Alison & Morrison Ltd designed the course when it opened in 1929.

Notable events hosted
1903 Western Open
1969 Walker Cup
1988 U.S. Senior Amateur
2008 U.S. Mid-Amateur

References 

Buildings and structures in Milwaukee County, Wisconsin
Golf clubs and courses in Wisconsin
Golf clubs and courses designed by Harry Colt